The 2002 Hong Kong Sevens was an international rugby sevens tournament that took place at the Hong Kong Stadium between 22–24 March 2002. It was the 27th edition of the Hong Kong Sevens and was the seventh tournament of the 2001–02 World Sevens Series. Twenty-four teams competed in the tournament and were separated into six groups of four with the top eight teams qualifying through to the cup tournament.

After winning their three group matches, England went on to win their first Hong Kong title defeating Fiji in the final by a score of 33–20. In the plate-final, South Africa defeated Scotland while Morocco took home the bowl defeating Chinese Taipei.

Teams
Compared to other tournament of the series, the Hong Kong Sevens had 24 teams compete for the title instead of the regular sixteen teams that usually competed in a World Series event. The official announcement of teams was revealed on the 22 January 2002. Almost a month later, Italy withdrew from the Hong Kong Sevens and was replaced by Thailand.

Format
The teams were drawn into six pools of four teams each. Each team played the other teams in their pool once, with three points awarded for a win, two points for a draw, and one point for a loss (no points awarded for a forfeit). The pool stage was played over the first two days of the tournament. The top team from each pool along with the two best runners-up advanced to the Cup quarter finals. The remaining four runners-up along with the four best third-placed teams advanced to the Plate quarter finals. The remaining eight teams went on to the Bowl quarter finals.

Pool stage

Pool A

Source: HK Sevens

Source: HK Sevens

Pool B

Source: HK Sevens

Source: HK Sevens

Pool C

Source: HK Sevens

Source: HK Sevens

Pool D

Source: HK Sevens

Source: HK Sevens

Pool E

Source: HK Sevens

Source: HK Sevens

Pool F

Source: HK Sevens

Source: HK Sevens

Knockout stage

Bowl

Source: Rugby7

Plate

Source: Rugby7

Cup

Source: Rugby7

Tournament placings

Source: Rugby7.com

References

Hong Kong Sevens
Hong Kong Sevens
Hong Kong Sevens
Hong Kong Sevens